Non-SMC element 4 homolog A is a protein that in humans is encoded by the NSMCE4A gene.

References

Further reading